The Rhode Island Department of Transportation (RIDOT) is a Rhode Island state government agency charged with design, construction, maintenance and inspection of a wide range of transportation infrastructure. These include 3,300 lane miles of state roads and highways, 1,162 bridges, 777 traffic signals, and six rail stations. Its headquarters are located in Providence.

Rhode Island ports are handled by the R.I. Economic Development Corporation, airports in Rhode Island are overseen by the subsidiary R.I. Airport Corporation, and passenger train service is operated by Amtrak (a federal semi-public corporation) and the Massachusetts Bay Transportation Authority (a state agency of Massachusetts).  Through the 1989 Pilgrim Partnership Agreement RIDOT financed construction of the  Boston-bound MBTA commuter rail service into Providence and beyond (see Providence/Stoughton Line). Driver's licenses and motor vehicle registrations are the responsibility of the R.I. Division of Motor Vehicles, an office of the Rhode Island Department of Revenue.  Two large bridges, the Claiborne Pell (Newport) Bridge and the Mount Hope Bridge, are under the responsibility of the R.I. Turnpike and Bridge Authority.

Presently, the State of Rhode Island has one of the highest proportion of structurally deficient bridges in the United States. According to a report by Transportation 4 America, nearly 68 percent of Rhode Island roads are rated in poor or mediocre condition, and 1 in 5 bridges in the state are structurally deficient – the fourth highest of any state. Additionally, the Providence Viaduct on Interstate 95 and the Route 10-Route 6 junction have structural deficiencies and require significant rehabilitation.

History
The State Board of Public Roads was created in 1902 to oversee construction, improvement, and maintenance of state-owned roadways. Prior to the creation of the Rhode Island State Board of Public Roads, the monitoring and maintenance of public roads was scattered and localized.

In 1909 an Automobile division was introduced with the responsibility of registering vehicles, issuing plates, and handling other aspects of vehicle administration. This division would become a precursor to the current Rhode Island Division of Motor Vehicles.

As part of the larger government restructuring into a departmental system in 1935, the Department of Public Works was created under PL 1935, chapter 2188. This department took over the responsibilities of the State Board of Public Roads, and included a division of roads and bridges, a division of public buildings, a division of state airports, and a division of harbors and rivers.

In 1970 the Rhode Island Department of Transportation was created by statutory authority in PL 1970, chapter 111 (RIGL §42-13-1) in order to bring together in one department all responsibilities relating to transportation. The newly formed Department of Transportation took over the functions of the Department of Public Works, the Registry of Motor Vehicles, the Rhode Island Turnpike and Bridge Authority, and the Council on Highway Safety.

See also
 Numbered routes in Rhode Island
 Rhode Island Public Transit Authority
 Rhode Island Department of Revenue
 T. F. Green Airport

References

External links
Official website
Rhode Island Highway Conditions
Guide to the Department of Transportation State Photolog Highway films from the Rhode Island State Archives
A Highway Program for Rhode Island from the Rhode Island State Archives
Department of Transportation Archeology Series from the Rhode Island State Archives
Department of Transportation Bridge negatives and microfilm from the Rhode Island State Archives
Department of Transportation Bridge photo albums box list from the Rhode Island State Archives
Guide to the Turnpike and Bridge Authority photographs, clippings and drawings from the Rhode Island State Archives
Historic Bridge Inventory Part III: Preservation Plan from the Rhode Island State Archives

Transportation in Rhode Island
State departments of transportation of the United States
State agencies of Rhode Island
1970 establishments in Rhode Island